William Titt (8 February 1881 – 5 May 1956) was a British gymnast who competed in the 1908 Summer Olympics and in the 1912 Summer Olympics. He was born in Cork. Originally named William Lebeau he took on the name of William Titt after his stepfather. When his stepfather died he reverted to the original Lebeau. As a member of the British team in 1908 he finished eighth in the team competition. He was part of the British team, which won the bronze medal in the gymnastics men's team, European system event in 1912.

References

External links
 
William Titt's profile at databaseOlympics
William Titt's profile at Sports Reference.com

1881 births
1956 deaths
Sportspeople from Cork (city)
British male artistic gymnasts
Gymnasts at the 1908 Summer Olympics
Gymnasts at the 1912 Summer Olympics
Olympic gymnasts of Great Britain
Olympic bronze medallists for Great Britain
Olympic medalists in gymnastics
Medalists at the 1912 Summer Olympics